The table lists various objects and units by the order of magnitude of their volume.

Sub-microscopic

Microscopic

Human measures

Terrestrial

Astronomical

References 

Volume